The Reduviinae are a subfamily of the reduviid assassin bugs. Many members of the subfamily are nocturnal and their lifecycles are generally poorly known.  This subfamily is suspected not to be monophyletic.

General
Acanthaspis Amyot and Serville, 1843
Alloeocranum Reuter, 1881
Durevius Villiers, 1962
Durganda Amyot and Serville, 1843
Durgandana Miller, 1957
Ectrichodiella Fracker & Bruner, 1924
Edocla Stål, 1857
Empyrocoris Miller, 1953
Ganesocoris Miller, 1955
Gerbelius Distant, 1930
Hadrokerala Wygodzinsky & Lent, 1980
Holotrichius Burmeister, 1835
Isdegardes Distant, 1909
Lenaeus Stål, 1859
Mesancanthapsis Livingstone & Murugan, 1993
Neocanthapsis Livingstone & Murugan, 1991
Neotiarodes Miller, 1957
Paralenaeus Reuter, 1881
Pasira Stål, 1859
Pasiropsis Reuter, 1881
Psyttala Stål, 1859
Psophis Stål, 1863
Platymeris Laporte, 1833
Pseudozelurus Lent & Wygodzinsky, 1947
Ripurocoris Miller, 1959
Reduvius Fabricius, 1775
Tapeinus Laporte, 1833
Tiarodes Burmeister, 1875
Tiarodurganda Breddin, 1903
Velitra Stål, 1866
Zeluroides Lent & Wygodzinsky, 1948
Zelurus Hahn

References

Further reading
Bellows, T.S. and Fisher T.W. (1999) Handbook of Biological Control: Principles and Applications. Academic Press, San Diego, California, 

Reduviidae
Hemiptera subfamilies